Pecher is a surname. Notable people with the surname include:

Charles Pecher (1913–1941), Belgian physician
Doris Pecher (born 1966), German diver
Édouard Pecher (1885–1926), Belgian lawyer and politician
Steve Pecher (born 1956), American soccer player